Bangladesh Institute of Peace Support Operation Training or BIPSOT is a military owned and operated institution that trains Bangladesh military and police personnel on peacekeeping in UN missions. It is located in Rajendrapur Cantonment, Gazipur, Bangladesh. It also trains military personnel of friendly nations.

The Commandant of BIPSOT is Major General A S M Ridwanur Rahman, awc, afwc, psc, G

History
The institute was formed in June 1999 by the Sheikh Hasina led Awami League Government. In 2011, Ban Ki Moon, Secretary general of the UN visited the institute and noted the role of Bangladeshi Peacekeepers in UN missions. In 2016, The Royal Thai Army expressed interest to use the institute. The language lab of the institute provides training in foreign languages such as French. It has trained more than 10,000 Bangladeshi peacekeepers.

References

1999 establishments in Bangladesh
Organisations based in Gazipur
Bangladesh Armed Forces education and training establishments